Weha Serawoch is an Ethiopian football club. They play in the Ethiopian Premier League, the top level of professional football in Ethiopia. 

 Ethiopian football site

Football clubs in Ethiopia